Powstanie Warszawskie (Polish for "Warsaw Uprising") is a second studio album released in March 2005 by Polish band Lao Che. It consists of 10 songs illustrating the course of 1944 uprising in Warsaw, Poland. The album received many prestigious nominations and awards:
 No. 1 Event in 2005's Polish music by Gazeta Wyborcza
 The best album of 2005 by listeners of Polskie Radio—Program III
 One of the five best albums in 2005 by Przekrój
 Nominee in The Best Alternative Album category of Fryderyki 2005.

Track listing
Titles in brackets are translated from Polish.
 "1939 / Przed Burzą" (1939 / Before the Storm)
 "Godzina W" (W-Hour)
 "Barykada" (Barricade)
 "Zrzuty" (Airdrops)
 "Stare Miasto" (Old Town)
 "Przebicie do Śródmieścia" (Breakout to the City Center)
 "Czerniaków"
 "Hitlerowcy" (Hitlerites)
 "Kanały" (Sewers)
 "Koniec" (The End)

References

External links
  Powstanie Warszawskie at the official website – lyrics, MP3 samples and song descriptions

2005 albums
Concept albums
Lao Che (band) albums